Kill Switch is a 2008 action film starring Steven Seagal and directed by Jeff F. King. Steven Seagal plays Detective Jacob King, a tough cop with a reputation for violent street-justice methods. King investigates murders in Memphis, Tennessee, perpetrated by a serial killer known as Lazerus. The film is also notable for featuring one of the last roles of Isaac Hayes.

Plot
Jacob King is a police officer in Memphis, Tennessee, whose brutal methods have gained him a legendary reputation among his colleagues. Seemingly indifferent to the fact his twin brother was murdered in front of him as a child, King investigates a series of brutal killings, most involving young, attractive women. The murderer, Lazerus, leaves cryptic, astrological clues at the crime scenes. At the same time, another murderer, Billy Joe Hill (Mark Collie), is killing women. King finds him and kicks him out a window repeatedly, after which Hill seeks revenge by murdering Celine (Karyn Michelle Baltzer), whom he believes to be King's girlfriend.

King goes on a brutal rampage through the Memphis underworld with the assistance of his partner, Detective Storm Anderson (Chris Thomas King) and the coroner (Isaac Hayes). King meets FBI agent Frankie Miller (Holly Dignard) but dislikes her because she does not approve of his methods. Lazerus attempts to frame King for the murder of a blonde barmaid, and Miller believes the frame and begins to pursue King. Meanwhile, King locates Lazerus and fights him, using a ball-peen hammer to break every bone in his body. He then goes after Billy Joe Hill and kills him after finding Celine dead.

King then chooses to exit the scene, leaving Anderson a note explaining he is quitting because no one likes his style of justice.

The final scene shows King returning to what appears to be his Russian wife and family.

Cast
 Steven Seagal as Detective Jacob King
 Holly Dignard as FBI Agent Frankie Miller
 Karyn Michelle Baltzer as Celine
 Chris Thomas King as Detective Storm Anderson
 Philip Granger as Captain Jensen
 Jerry Rector as CDLU Lawyer
 Isaac Hayes as Coroner
 Michael Filipowich as Lazerus Jones
 Mark Collie as Billy Joe Hill

Theatrical release
The film later received theatrical distribution exclusively in the UAE in 2009.

References

External links
 
Review by Vern at Aint It Cool News

American crime thriller films
Canadian crime thriller films
2008 direct-to-video films
2008 action thriller films
2000s crime thriller films
American action thriller films
American direct-to-video films
Canadian action thriller films
Canadian direct-to-video films
CineTel Films films
Films set in Memphis, Tennessee
Films shot in Vancouver
Nu Image films
2008 films
2000s English-language films
Films directed by Jeff F. King
2000s American films
2000s Canadian films